European cuisine comprises the cuisines of Europe including the cuisines brought to other countries by European settlers and colonists. Sometimes the term "European", or more specifically "continental" cuisine, is used to refer more strictly to the cuisine of the western parts of mainland Europe.

The cuisines of Western countries are diverse, although there are common characteristics that distinguish them from those of other regions. Compared with traditional cooking of East Asia, meat is more prominent and substantial in serving size. Bread, cured meat, cheese, steak and cutlets in particular are common dishes across the West. Western cuisines also emphasize grape wine and sauces as condiments, seasonings, or accompaniments (in part due to the difficulty of seasonings penetrating the often larger pieces of meat used in Western cooking). Many dairy products are utilised in cooking. There are hundreds of varieties of cheese and other fermented milk products. White wheat-flour bread has long been the prestige starch, but historically, most people ate bread, flatcakes, or porridge made from rye, spelt, barley, and oats. Those better-off would also make pasta, dumplings and pastries. The potato has become a major starch plant in the diet of Europeans and their diaspora since the European colonisation of the Americas. Maize is much less common in most European diets than it is in the Americas; however, corn meal (polenta or mămăligă) is a major part of the cuisine of Italy and the Balkans. Although flatbreads (especially with toppings such as pizza or tarte flambée) and rice are eaten in Europe, they are only staple foods in limited areas, particularly in Southern Europe.  Salads (cold dishes with uncooked or cooked vegetables, sometimes with a dressing) are an integral part of European cuisine.

Formal European dinners are served in distinct courses. European presentation evolved from service à la française, or bringing multiple dishes to the table at once, into service à la russe, where dishes are presented sequentially. Usually, cold, hot and savoury, and sweet dishes are served strictly separately in this order, as hors d'oeuvre (appetizer) or soup, as entrée and main course, and as dessert. Dishes that are both sweet and savoury were common earlier in Ancient Roman cuisine, but are today uncommon, with sweet dishes being served only as dessert. A service where the guests are free to take food by themselves is termed a buffet, and is usually restricted to parties or holidays. Nevertheless, guests are expected to follow the same pattern.

Historically, European cuisine has been developed in the European royal and noble courts. European nobility was usually arms-bearing and lived in separate manors in the countryside. The knife was the primary eating implement (cutlery), and eating steaks and other foods that require cutting followed. This contrasted with East Asian cuisine, where the ruling class were the court officials, who had their food prepared ready to eat in the kitchen, to be eaten with chopsticks. The knife was supplanted by the spoon for soups, while the fork was introduced later in the early modern period, ca. 16th century. Today, most dishes are intended to be eaten with cutlery and only a few finger foods can be eaten with the hands in polite company.

History

Medieval
In medieval times, a person's diet varied depending on their social class. Cereal grains made up a lot of a medieval person's diet, regardless of social class. Bread was common to both classes- it was taken as a lunch for the working man, and thick slices of it were used as plates called trenchers. People of the noble class had access to finely ground flours for their breads and other baked goods. Noblemen were allowed to hunt for deer, boar, rabbits, birds, and other animals, giving them access to fresh meat and fish for their meals. Dishes for people of these classes were often heavily spiced. Spices at that time were very expensive, and the more spices used in dishes, the more wealth the person had to be able to purchase such ingredients. Common spices used were cinnamon, ginger, nutmeg, pepper, cumin, cloves, turmeric, anise, and saffron. Other ingredients used in dishes for the nobility and clergy included sugar, almonds and dried fruits like raisins. These imported ingredients would have been very expensive and nearly impossible for commoners to obtain. When banquets were held, the dishes served would be very spectacular- another way for the noblemen to show how rich they were. Sugar sculptures would be placed on the tables as decoration and to eat, and foods would be dyed vibrant colors with imported spices. 

The diet of a commoner would have been much more simple. Strict poaching laws prevented them from hunting, and if they did hunt and were caught, they could have parts of their limbs cut off or they could be killed. Much of the commoners food would have been preserved in some way, such as through pickling or by being salted. Breads would have been made using rye or barley, and any vegetables would likely have been grown by the commoners themselves. Peasants would have likely been able to keep cows, and so would have access to milk, which then allowed them to make butter or cheese. When meat was eaten, it would have been beef, pork, or lamb. Commoners also ate a dish called pottage, a thick stew of vegetables, grains, and meat.

Early modern era

In the early modern era, European cuisine saw an influx of new ingredients due to the Columbian Exchange, such as the potato, tomato, eggplant, chocolate, bell pepper, pumpkins, and other squash. Distilled spirits, along with tea, coffee, and chocolate were all popularized during this time. In the 1780s, the idea of the modern restaurant was introduced in Paris; the French Revolution accelerated its development, quickly spreading around Europe.

Central European cuisines

All of these countries have their specialities. Austria is famous for Wiener Schnitzel - a breaded veal cutlet served with a slice of lemon, the Czech Republic for world renowned beers. Germany for world-famous wursts, Hungary for goulash. Slovakia is famous for gnocchi-like Halusky pasta. Slovenia is known for German and Italian influenced cuisine, Poland for world-famous Pierogis which are a cross between a ravioli and an empanada. Liechtenstein and German speaking Switzerland are famous for Rösti and French speaking Switzerland for fondue and Raclettes.

 Ashkenazi Jewish cuisine
  Austrian cuisine
  Viennese cuisine
  Czech cuisine
  Moravian cuisine
  German cuisine
 Baden cuisine
  Bavarian cuisine
  Brandenburg cuisine
  Franconian cuisine
  Hamburg cuisine
  Hessian cuisine
  Lower Saxon cuisine
  Mecklenburg cuisine
 Palatine cuisine
 Pomeranian cuisine
  Saxon cuisine
 Ore Mountain cuisine
  Schleswig-Holstein cuisine
 Swabian cuisine
  Hungarian cuisine
  Polish cuisine
  Lublin cuisine
  Podlaskie cuisine
  Świętokrzyskie cuisine
  Liechtensteiner cuisine
  Silesian cuisine
  Slovak cuisine
  Slovenian cuisine
  Swiss cuisine

Eastern European cuisines

  Armenian cuisine
  Azerbaijani cuisine
  Belarusian cuisine
  Bulgarian cuisine
  Georgian cuisine
  Kazakh cuisine
  Moldovan cuisine
  Gagauz cuisine
   Ossetian cuisine
  Romanian cuisine
  Russian cuisine
  Bashkir cuisine
  Komi cuisine
  Mordovian cuisine
  North Caucasian cuisine
  Chechen cuisine
  Circassian cuisine
  Tatar cuisine
  Udmurt cuisine
 Yamal cuisine
  Ukrainian cuisine
  Crimean Tatar cuisine
  Odesite cuisine

Northern European cuisines
  British cuisine
   Channel Islands cuisine
  English cuisine
  Cornish cuisine
  Devonian cuisine
  Dorset cuisine
 Victorian cuisine
 Northern Irish cuisine
  Scottish cuisine
  Welsh cuisine
 Cuisine of Carmarthenshire
 Cuisine of Ceredigion
 Cuisine of Gower
 Cuisine of Monmouthshire
 Cuisine of Pembrokeshire
  Danish cuisine
  Faroese cuisine
 New Nordic Cuisine
  Estonian cuisine
  Finnish cuisine
  Icelandic cuisine
  Irish cuisine
  Latvian cuisine
  Lithuanian cuisine
  Livonian cuisine
  Norwegian cuisine
  Sami cuisine
  Swedish cuisine

Southern European cuisines

  Albanian cuisine
  Kosovan cuisine
  Aromanian cuisine
  Bosnian cuisine
  Croatian cuisine
  Cypriot cuisine
  Gibraltarian cuisine
  Greek cuisine
 Ancient Greek cuisine
  Byzantine cuisine
  Cretan cuisine
 Epirotic cuisine
  Greek Macedonian cuisine
  Ionian cuisine
  Italian cuisine
  Abruzzian cuisine 
 Ancient Roman cuisine
  Apulian cuisine
 Arbëreshë cuisine
  Ligurian cuisine
  Lombard cuisine
  Mantuan cuisine
  Lucanian cuisine
  Neapolitan cuisine
  Roman cuisine
  Sardinian cuisine
  Sicilian cuisine
  Venetian cuisine
  Macedonian cuisine
  Maltese cuisine
  Montenegrin cuisine
  Ottoman cuisine
  Portuguese cuisine
  Sammarinese cuisine
 Sephardic Jewish cuisine
  Serbian cuisine
  Spanish cuisine
  Andalusian cuisine
  Aragonese cuisine
  Asturian cuisine
  Balearic cuisine
  Menorcan cuisine
  Basque cuisine
  Canarian cuisine
  Cantabrian cuisine
  Castilian-Leonese cuisine
  Vallisoletano cuisine
  Catalan cuisine
  Castilian-Manchego cuisine
  Extremaduran cuisine
  Galician cuisine
  Madrilenian cuisine
  Valencian cuisine
  Turkish cuisine

Western European cuisines
  Belgian cuisine
  Dutch cuisine
  French cuisine
  Corsican cuisine
 Haute cuisine
 Cuisine classique
 Nouvelle cuisine
  Lyonnaise cuisine
  Luxembourgian cuisine
 Mennonite cuisine
  Monégasque cuisine
  Occitan cuisine

See also

 Early modern European cuisine
 Medieval cuisine
 Jewish cuisine
 Romani cuisine
 Soviet cuisine
 Yoshoku

References

Further reading
 
 

 
Food- and drink-related lists
Cuisine by continent